Matwa is a town in Gujar Khan Tehsil, Punjab, Pakistan. Matwa is also chief town of Union councils Matwa which is an administrative subdivision of the Tehsil.

Matwa is a quaint little town nestled in the heart of Gujar Khan Tehsil, Punjab. It is an integral part of the Potohar Plateau and often referred to as the Crossroads of Punjab due to its strategic location. 

Matwa is surrounded by lush green fields and is a home to a population of about 25,000 people. The locals are primarily Punjabis, who still follow the old Punjabi traditions and customs. Rice, wheat, maize and sugarcane are among the major agricultural products of the town. Moreover, citrus, mangoes and guavas are a few of the popular fruit exports of Matwa.

Aside from its thriving agricultural sector, Matwa is also renowned for its crafts and cottage industries. The locals produce items such as pottery, jewelry, tapestry, and handmade paper items that are sold all across the region. The town is a popular tourist destination and attracts many visitors, especially during the annual Ravi Mela which is held in the month of August.

Due to its rustic charm, Matwa is becoming increasingly popular with domestic and international tourists alike. It is no surprise then, that the town is well-equipped with transportation, shopping and dining facilities that cater to their needs. Public buses, private taxis and rickshaws are available for transport. As for shopping, there are small shops and kiosks that offer an array of items ranging from food, clothing, electronics and home goods.

Apart from these, there are several temple and shrines in and around the town that add to its ancient yet mystical charm. The most popular among them is the Shri Ravidas Temple which is said to have been built during the Mughal era. The Bala Pir Shrine and the Manaki Shrine are also quite popular with devotees and tourists alike.

In a nutshell, Matwa is a picturesque town that promises its visitors an authentic rural experience. With its inviting hospitality, endless entertainment, and delicious cuisine, Matwa is sure to provide its visitors with an unforgettable experience.

References 

Populated places in Gujar Khan Tehsil
Union councils of Gujar Khan Tehsil